The 1985/86 NTFL season was the 65th season of the Northern Territory Football League (NTFL).

St Marys have won there 13th premiership title while defeating the Nightcliff Tigers in the grand final by 178 points, the highest winning margin in an NTFL grand final.

Grand Final

References

Northern Territory Football League seasons
NTFL